The Irish Congress of Trade Unions (often abbreviated to just Congress or ICTU), formed in 1959 by the merger of the Irish Trades Union Congress (founded in 1894) and the Congress of Irish Unions (founded in 1945), is a national trade union centre, the umbrella organisation to which trade unions in both the Republic of Ireland and Northern Ireland affiliate.

Influence
There are currently 55 trade unions with membership of Congress, representing about 600,000 members in the Republic of Ireland. Trade union members represent 35.1% of the Republic's workforce. This is a significant decline since the 55.3% recorded in 1980 and the 38.5% reported in 2003. In the Republic, roughly 50% of union members are in the public sector. The ICTU represents trade unions in negotiations with employers and the government with regard to pay and working conditions

Structure
The supreme policy-making body of Congress is the Biennial Delegate Conference, to which affiliated unions send delegates. On a day-to-day basis Congress is run by an Executive Committee and a staffed secretariat headed up by the general secretary, Patricia King who succeeded David Begg in the position in 2015.

John Douglas of Mandate became President of Congress at the biennial conference in Belfast in July 2013 succeeding Eugene McGlone of Unite. The president serves for a two-year period and is succeeded by one of two vice-presidents.

Congress is the sole Irish affiliate of the ETUC, the representative body for trade unions at European level and of the International Trade Union Confederation ITUC

Social pacts
Congress enjoyed unprecedented political and economic influence over the period from 1987 to 2009 under the umbrella of Ireland's social partnership arrangements. This involved a series of seven corporatist agreements with the government and the main manufacturing/services employer body IBEC and the construction employers' lobby, CIF (Construction Industry Federation). It was a classic European-style alliance of government, labour and capital built on six decades of voluntary employment relations regulated by state institutions such as the Labour Court.

For many years the union leaders agreed to dampen pay rises in return for regular reductions in income tax rates. They also negotiated a new system of pay determination for public service employees under the rubric of "benchmarking" using external assessment of pay scales for assorted grades.

The era of Christian democratic style corporatism also saw a dramatic fall in trade union density from 62% in 1980 to 31% in 2007 and consolidation through mergers of many affiliated trade unions. Efforts to launch recruitment and organising initiatives failed to secure adequate support from affiliated unions while attempts to secure indirect forms of union recognition through legislation collapsed after successful legal challenges and appeals by the anti-union Ryanair company.

Ireland's period of centralised 'social pacts' ended in late 2009 when the government imposed pay cuts of between 5% and 8% on public service employees. The joint-stewardship of the state's FÁS training and employment authority by Congress and IBEC and accompanied waste of public and EU funds and excessive spending on directors 'junkets' further weakened the public standing of Congress and its 'social partnership' structures.

In an assessment of the post-partnership situation, Congress general secretary David Begg prepared a strategic review paper in which he identified the increasing weakness of the Congress and individual trade unions being due to "recession and change in the balance of power with capital" as well as job cuts, poor organisation, especially in high-technology companies, and a growing rift between public and private sector employees.

On a more positive note Begg asserted that the ending of social partnership arrangements  "liberates us to advocate and campaign for our own policies".

Other activities 
A "mass rally", organised by the Irish Congress of Trade Unions, Amnesty International, and the Rainbow Project  in support of same-sex marriage in Northern Ireland took place on 13 June 2015 in Belfast, with a 20,000 person turnout.

Affiliated unions
Association of First Division Civil Servants
Association of Higher Civil and Public Servants
Association of Irish Traditional Musicians
Association of Secondary Teachers of Ireland
Bakers, Food and Allied Workers Union
British Actors Equity Association
Broadcasting Entertainment Cinematograph and Theatre Union
Building and Allied Trades' Union
Chartered Society of Physiotherapy
Communication Workers Union (Ireland)
Communication Workers Union (UK)
Connect Trade Union

Energy Services Union
Fire Brigades Union
Fórsa
GMB Union
Guinness Staff Union
Irish Bank Officials' Association
Irish Federation of University Teachers
Irish Medical Organisation
Irish National Teachers Organisation
Irish Nurses and Midwives Organisation
MANDATE
Medical Laboratory Scientists Association
National Union of Journalists
National Association of Schoolmasters Union of Women Teachers
Northern Ireland Public Service Alliance
National Union of Rail, Maritime and Transport Workers
Operative Plasterers and Allied Trades Society of Ireland
Prison Officers' Association (Ireland)
Prospect
Public and Commercial Services Union
SIPTU (Services Industrial Professional Technical Union)
Teachers' Union of Ireland
Technical Engineering and Electrical Union
Transport Salaried Staffs Association
Ulster Teachers' Union
Union of Shop, Distributive and Allied Workers
Unison
Unite the Union
University and College Union
Veterinary Ireland
Veterinary Officers Association

Former members
ACCORD
Association of Teachers and Lecturers
Civil and Public Services Union
Irish Municipal, Public and Civil Trade Union
National Union of Sheet Metal Workers of Ireland
Prison Officers' Association (Northern Ireland)
Public Service Executive Union
Society of Radiographers
Union of Construction, Allied Trades and Technicians

General Secretaries
1959: James Larkin Jnr
1960: Leo Crawford and Ruaidhri Roberts
1967: Ruaidhri Roberts
1982: Donal Nevin
1989: Peter Cassells
2001: David Begg
2015: Patricia King
2022: Owen Reidy

Presidents

Treasurers
1959: Walter Beirne
1960: John Conroy
1967: Fintan Kennedy
1982: Patrick Clancy
1985: Christy Kirwan
1989: Edmund Browne
1995: Bill Attley
1999: Jimmy Somers
2001: John McDonnell
2003: Joe O'Flynn

See also

 List of trade unions
 List of federations of trade unions
 Trades Union Congress
 General Federation of Trade Unions (UK)
 Scottish Trades Union Congress

References

External links

Congress – Northern Ireland Committee

1959 establishments in Ireland
International Trade Union Confederation
European Trade Union Confederation
National trade union centres of Ireland
All-Ireland organisations
National trade union centres of the United Kingdom
Trade unions established in 1959
Seanad nominating bodies